Gary Alan Chism (born December 24, 1950) is an American Republican politician. He served as a member of the Mississippi House of Representatives under two districts: the 40th from 2000 to 2004 and the 37th from 2004 to 2020. Chism retired from the legislature on June 30, 2020.

References

1950 births
Living people
People from Columbus, Mississippi
Republican Party members of the Mississippi House of Representatives
21st-century American politicians